The Wickham Heights are a rugged chain of mountains on East Falkland in the Falkland Islands. They include the island group's highest peak, Mount Usborne, Mount Wickham and are partly contiguous with No Man's Land.

They form the "spine" of the East Falkland, north of Lafonia.

Rivers and streams such as the Malo River and San Carlos River spring in the Wickham Heights.

References

Mountains of East Falkland
Mountain ranges of South America